Contents: National Register of Historic Places listings in Carson City, Nevada, USA:

The locations of National Register properties and districts (at least for all showing latitude and longitude coordinates below), may be seen in an online map by clicking on "Map of all coordinates".

|}

Former listings

|}

See also

List of National Historic Landmarks in Nevada
National Register of Historic Places listings in Nevada

References

 
Carson
Carson City, Nevada